Ramakrishna Vidyakendra is a  charitable high school and composite junior college located at Ramakrishna Nagar in the Karnataka province of India.

History
The school was established by Sri Ramakrishna Seva Sangh, a non-profit organization based upon the ideals of Sri Ramakrishna Paramahamsa and Swamy Vivekananda. The school was upgraded to a junior college in 2015.

Services
The school is located at Ramakrishna Nagar, a residential suburb of Mysore. The students of the school are generally from working-class backgrounds. The school also organizes free medical camps for the poor on Sundays.

Infrastructure
The school has a three-storied building for the classrooms and about 1.5 acres of playground space.

Ideology
The education in the school is based upon the ideologies of Swamy Vivekananda but follows the government pattern.

Scholarships
The school gives "Poverty-cum-Progress" scholarships to poor students on a regular basis.

See also
 Sri Ramakrishna Vidyashala
 Ramakrishna Nagar
 Kuvempunagar

References

Organisations based in Mysore
High schools and secondary schools in Mysore
Educational institutions established in 1991
1991 establishments in Karnataka